Le Monastier-sur-Gazeille is a commune in the Haute-Loire department in south-central France.

Population

Sights
The official start of the Robert Louis Stevenson Trail (GR 70), a popular long-distance path, is at Place de la Poste in the centre of the village, marked by a plaque. Stevenson spent about a month in Le Monastier before setting off on his travels, as recounted in Travels with a Donkey in the Cévennes.

See also
Communes of the Haute-Loire department

References

External links
Le Monastier sur Gazeille in Haute-Loire (French)

Communes of Haute-Loire